Kadir Kasirga (born 1975) is a Swedish politician. He served as Member of the Riksdag representing the constituency of Stockholm Municipality from 24 September 2018 to 8 March 2020. Sultan Kayhan took his place in the Riksdag after Kasirga resigned. He became a member of the Riksdag again in 2022.

References 

Living people
1975 births
Place of birth missing (living people)
Members of the Riksdag from the Social Democrats
Members of the Riksdag 2018–2022
Kurds in Sweden
21st-century Swedish politicians
Members of the Riksdag 2022–2026